Fitton Hill is a large housing estate in the town of Oldham in Greater Manchester, contiguous with Hathershaw and Bardsley.

Lying 2 miles south of Oldham town centre, the Fitton Hill estate was built during the 1950s and 1960s on previously undeveloped moorland with scattered hamlets and farmsteads. The layout of the estate obliterated all traces of the old landscape.

Two churches serve the area, the Roman Catholic church of Holy Rosary and St Cuthbert's, Church of England. The Holy Rosary, opened in 1955, contains a significant mural by Georg Mayer-Marton.

Three primary schools serve the area, Medlock Valley Community School, St Martin's School and Holy Rosary RC Primary.  See List of schools in Oldham.

History
Archaically lying in the Knott Lanes division of Ashton township, Fitton Hill anciently constituted a farmstead, one of several once lying within the area built upon by the estate. All the hamlets and farms have now gone but place-names such as Deanshut and Marland Fold survived in the guise of street names and schools in the area.

The former Fitton Hill farm dated from as early as 1618 when an Edmund Fitton was recorded as residing there.

From 1894 the area around Fitton Hill was part of the civil parish of Bardsley in the Limehurst Rural District until its abolition in 1954, when its territory was divided between the towns of Oldham and Ashton Under Lyne.

Transport
First Greater Manchester provides service 426 to Fitton Hill from Oldham.

Stotts Tours (Oldham) provides service 396 to Ashton Under Lyne and to Middleton via Chadderton.

References

Areas of Oldham